Cabin Pressure may refer to:
 Cabin pressurization in aircraft
 Cabin Pressure (film), a 2001 Canadian film
 Cabin Pressure (radio series), a BBC Radio comedy series
 Cabin Pressure (Dead Zone), an episode of The Dead Zone